Eduard Hauser (22 June 1895 – 16 July 1961) was a German general in the Wehrmacht during World War II who commanded the 13th Panzer Division. He was a recipient of the Knight's Cross of the Iron Cross with Oak Leaves.

Biography
Born in Bavaria in 1895, Hauser joined the army of Imperial Germany in 1914 as a Fahnen-junker (officer cadet) and served in the 17th Bavarian Infantry Regiment during World War I. As an officer in the Heer (Army) branch of the Wehrmacht, he was on the staff of Generalleutnant  Heinz Guderian's XIX Corps during the Invasion of Poland before being given command of the 18th Panzer Regiment in 1940. His new command was part of the newly formed 18th Panzer Division and went on to participate in Operation Barbarossa the following year and the subsequent battles along the centre of the Eastern Front.

In late 1941, Hauser, with the rank of oberst (colonel), was given command of 25th Panzer Regiment, 7th Panzer Division. This too was serving on the Eastern Front but by now the winter had set in. Casualties and mechanical attrition were high across the division; at one stage, Hauser's regiment had only five tanks in operation and most personnel were fighting as infantry. During this period he was awarded the Knight's Cross of the Iron Cross. In May 1942, the division was withdrawn to France for recuperation and refit.

On 1 September 1943, Hauser was appointed to command of the 13th Panzer Division, taking over from Hellmut von der Chevallerie who had been wounded. The division had been heavily engaged in fighting in the Ukraine, leading a breakout when it, along with the 336th Infantry Division and the 15th Luftwaffe Field Division, became encircled by Soviet forces. Hauser led the division in further fighting in the sector until being wounded in late December 1943. He had been promoted generalmajor earlier that month.

While recovering from his wounds, Hauser was awarded the Knight's Cross of the Iron Cross with Oak Leaves for his service with the 13th Panzer Division. Promoted to generalleutnant, he returned to the Eastern Front as commander of what was designated Division. Stab 605 z.b.V. (Special Purposes Divisional Staff 605), informally known Kampfgruppe Hauser, in June 1944. Part of 4th Army, this operated in the East Prussia sector until April 1945.

After the war, Hauser returned to Bavaria and settled in the town of Garmisch.

Awards and decorations
 Iron Cross (1914) 2nd Class & 1st Class
 Iron Cross (1939) 2nd Class & 1st Class
 Knight's Cross of the Iron Cross on 4 December 1941 as oberst (colonel) and commander of 25th Panzer Regiment  
 Knight's Cross of the Iron Cross with Oak Leaves on 26 January 1944 as generalmajor (major general) and commander of 13th Panzer Division

Notes
Footnotes

Citations

References

 

 

1895 births
1961 deaths
People from the Kingdom of Bavaria
German Army personnel of World War I
Lieutenant generals of the German Army (Wehrmacht)
Recipients of the clasp to the Iron Cross, 1st class
Recipients of the Knight's Cross of the Iron Cross with Oak Leaves
World War I prisoners of war held by the United Kingdom
German prisoners of war in World War II held by the United States
Military personnel from Erlangen